Haeterius blanchardi is a species of clown beetle in the family Histeridae. These beetles are native to the United States, and have been found in Wisconsin, Massachusetts, and New Jersey.

Haeterius blanchardi is a Myrmecophily species, living in colonies of the ant species Formica pallidefulva. The larvae remain undescribed, but likely develop in the nests of the host ants.

References

Further reading

 
 
 
 
 
 

Histeridae
Beetles described in 1878